In art, musivisual language is a semiotic system that is the synchronous union of music and image. The term was coined by Spanish composer Alejandro Román, and for over a century, has appeared in film and other media (television, video or multimedia).

Definition 
According to Román:

When film music and text connect, they produce meanings distinct from the separate elements. In this communication process, musical codes (melody, rhythm, harmony, sound, texture, form), in synchrony with the film (image, speech, noise...) interact. 

Román defines two levels for this language: semiotic, i.e. the contribution of meaning of music over the image, and the specific aesthetic of film music, which means it has its own stylistic elements not belonging to other musical forms. These elements are determined by the cinematic form.

See also 
 Solresol
 Language
 Semiotics
 Aesthetics
 Film score
 Soundtrack
 Alejandro Román
 Visual language

Bibliography 

  Arijon, Daniel, Gramática del Lenguaje Audiovisual, La Primitiva Casa Baroja, San Sebastián, 1976
  Chion, Michel, La audiovisión. Introducción a un análisis conjunto de la imagen y el sonido, Paidós Comunicación, Barcelona, 1993
  Gértrudix Barrio, Manuel. Música y narración en los medios audiovisuales, Ediciones del Laberinto, S.L., Madrid, 2003
  Olarte Martínez, Matilde (editora), La música en los Medios Audiovisuales, Plaza Universitaria Ediciones, Salamanca, 2005
  Román, Alejandro, El Lenguaje Musivisual, semiótica y estética de la música cinematográfica, Editorial Visión Libros, Madrid, 2008
  Román, Alejandro, Estética de la música cinematográfica, aspectos diferenciadores, en Matilde Olarte Martínez (editora), Reflexiones en torno a la música y la imagen desde la musicología española, Plaza Universitaria Ediciones, Salamanca, 2009

External links 
 Website of the book The Musivisual Language, semiotics and aesthetics of film music
 Website of Alejandro Román, spanish composer

Language
Music semiology
Aesthetics
Film theory